The Interim Fast Attack Vehicle (IFAV) is a reconnaissance vehicle deployed and used by the United States Marine Force Recon and Marine Expeditionary Units. Force Recon used to operate a fleet of Desert Patrol Vehicles (formerly known as Fast Attack Vehicles or FAVs for short), popularized by the Navy SEALs as the "black dune buggy." However, this vehicle lacked cargo capacity and firepower, so Force Recon moved to a militarized  Mercedes-Benz G-Class, also known as a G-wagen, 290 GDT diesel 4×4, a much more traditional "Jeep" type truck. The vehicle has only minimal armor, but numerous defensive weapons, including a Mk 19 automatic 40 mm grenade launcher. This vehicle is manufactured by Magna Steyr (Austria) for Mercedes-Benz (Germany).

The IFAV has since been replaced by the Internally Transportable Light Strike Vehicle (ITV-LSV).

Overview 
The USMC Interim Fast Attack Vehicle (IFAV) is a modified version of the Mercedes-Benz Geländewagen 290. It replaces the modified M151A2 1/4 ton truck jeep used by the Marines as a FAV in the 1990s.  The U.S. Marine Corps acquired 157 of the IFAVs distributed as follows:
Marine Expeditionary Force (MEF) Camp Pendleton, CA (33);
MEF Camp Lejeune, NC (25);
MEF on Okinawa, Japan (27);
17th Force Recon, Afghanistan (22);
3rd Force Recon Bn, Iraq (23);
1st Provisional DMZ Police Company, Korea (15);
various miscellaneous (12).

See also 
United States Marine Corps Force Reconnaissance
Mercedes-Benz G-Class
Willys FAMAE Corvo
Humvee
FN Herstal AS 24
Desert Patrol Vehicle
FMC XR311
Technical
M151
Ranger Special Operations Vehicle (RSOV)

External links 

 GlobalSecurity.org, LKW gl leicht Wolf: Interim Fast Attack Vehicles (IFAV)
 Popular Mechanics, All the Combat Vehicles of the U.S. Military in One Giant Poster: IFAV listed in Special Operations

Military light utility vehicles
Mercedes-Benz G-Class
Military vehicles introduced in the 1990s